Centralia College is a public community college in Centralia, Washington. Although it primarily offers certificates and Associate degrees, it also offers a few Bachelor's degrees. Founded in 1925, Centralia is the oldest continuously operating community college in the state of Washington. There is a branch education center, Centralia College East, in the town of Morton and the college offers a range of online and correspondence courses.

History
Centralia College opened in 1925 under the name of Centralia Junior College.  Developing slowly at first, the college constructed its first physical campus in 1950 with Kemp Hall.  Also, in 1948 the college received its accreditation from the Northwest Commission on Colleges and Universities.  Growing from an entrance class of 15 students,  the college has an enrollment of 4,803 students in 64 academic programs.  The college is affiliated with the private Centralia College Foundation, founded in 1982 by community members, to supplement its public resources.

The college is also home to Michael Spafford's The Twelve Labors of Hercules, a series of murals commissioned in the early 1980s for the House of Representatives' chambers.  From 1982 to 1987 they were covered with curtains due to their perceived (by some) sexually suggestive nature and later were placed in storage.  Following a decade of negotiations, the college acquired the murals in 2002 for display in the Corbet Theatre. Murals created by Alden Mason and originally displayed at the Capitol were moved to the college library in 1990.

In 2012 the college began offering a Bachelor of Applied Science in Applied Management degree.  It now offers a Bachelor of Applied Science in Diesel Technology degree and a Bachelor of Applied Science in Information Science and Application Development degree.

Athletics
The college's mascot is the Trailblazer and the athletics program includes teams for women's volleyball, men's baseball, men's and women's basketball, women's fast pitch softball and women's golf. These teams play in the Northwest Athletic Conference (NWAC).

References

External links
Official site

 
Community colleges in Washington (state)
Education in Lewis County, Washington
Education in Thurston County, Washington
Educational institutions established in 1925
Universities and colleges accredited by the Northwest Commission on Colleges and Universities
Centralia, Washington
Buildings and structures in Lewis County, Washington
1925 establishments in Washington (state)